Chowchilla may refer to:

 Chowchilla, a bird (Orthonyx spaldingii)
 Chowchilla, California, a city in Madera County, California, USA
 Chowchilla Airport
 the 1976 Chowchilla kidnapping of a school bus driver and 26 children in Chowchilla, California
 Chowchilla River, a river in Central California and a minor tributary of the San Joaquin River